Contres may refer to the following places in France:

Contres, Cher, a commune in the department of Cher
Contres, Loir-et-Cher, a commune in the department of Loir-et-Cher